The Sri Lanka national cricket team toured India during the 1997–98 cricket season, playing three Test matches and three One Day Internationals (ODIs). Both series were drawn; all three Tests were draws, and each side won one of the ODIs, tying the series 1–1. The other ODI, which was held on 25 December, was abandoned after three overs had been bowled, when after discussion between the two captains and the match referee, it was determined that the inconsistent bounce of the pitch was too dangerous for the players. This was the first occasion on which an international cricket match had been called off for this reason.

The third ODI was marred by umpiring controversy and disruption from the crowd. During India's innings, Ajay Jadeja was given out, after being caught behind. The umpire initially raised his finger to dismiss the batsman, but then changed his mind, and continued raising his finger to adjust his hat. He then turned down the appeal, and Jadeja continued to bat. Elmo Rodrigopulle, writing for Cricinfo, reported that "it was a mockery on the umpiring fraternity and what umpiring stands for." Later, in Sri Lanka's reply, when they were 205 for four, needing just 29 more runs for victory, the game was held up because spectators threw bottles onto the field. After a ten-minute delay, the match resumed, and Sri Lanka won by five wickets.

The tour began on 13 November, when the Sri Lankans played an Indian XI for Anshuman Gaekwad's benefit match, and concluded with the third ODI on 28 December. Sourav Ganguly was named player of the Test series, in which he was the leading run-scorer from either side, aggregating 392 runs. The most prolific batsman in the ODI series was Sri Lanka's Roshan Mahanama, who was named the player of the ODI series.

Test series

1st Test

2nd Test

3rd Test

One Day International series

1st ODI

2nd ODI

3rd ODI

References

External links

1997 in Indian cricket
1997 in Sri Lankan cricket
Indian cricket seasons from 1970–71 to 1999–2000
International cricket competitions from 1997–98 to 2000
1997